Karel Zouhar (21 January 1917, Rudice – 14 March 1985) was a Czechoslovakian Flight Lieutenant in the Royal Air Force during World War II.

Awards and decorations
Czechoslovak War Cross 1939-1945

References

1917 births
1985 deaths
People from Blansko District
People from the Margraviate of Moravia
Czechoslovak military personnel of World War II
Royal Air Force pilots of World War II
Czech World War II pilots
Recipients of the Czechoslovak War Cross